Clystea jacksoni is a moth of the subfamily Arctiinae. It was described by William James Kaye in 1925. It is found in Trinidad.

References

Clystea
Moths described in 1925